The 2024 AFC U-20 Women's Asian Cup will be the 11th edition of the AFC U-20 Women's Asian Cup (including previous editions of the AFC U-20 Women's Championship and AFC U-19 Women's Championship), the biennial international youth football championship organised by the Asian Football Confederation (AFC) for the women's under-20 national teams of Asia.

It will be held in Uzbekistan between 3–16 March 2024. A total of eight teams will compete in the tournament.

The top three teams of the tournament will qualify for the 2024 FIFA U-20 Women's World Cup as the AFC representatives. Japan are the defending champions.

Qualification

The host country and the top three teams of the previous tournament in 2019 will qualify automatically, while the other four teams will be decided by qualification. There will be two rounds of qualification matches, with the first round scheduled to be played between 4–12 March 2023, and the second round scheduled to be played between 3–11 June 2023.

Qualified teams
The following teams qualified for the tournament.

Qualified teams for FIFA U-20 Women's World Cup
The following three teams from AFC qualify for the 2024 FIFA U-20 Women's World Cup.

1 Bold indicates champions for that year. Italic indicates hosts for that year.

References

External links
, the-AFC.com

 
2024
U-20 Women's Asian Cup
2024 in women's association football
2024 in youth association football
International association football competitions hosted by Uzbekistan
2024 FIFA U-20 Women's World Cup qualification
March 2024 sports events in Asia
Scheduled association football competitions